Jõelähtme is a village in Jõelähtme Parish, Harju County, northern Estonia.

Gallery

References

 

Villages in Harju County
Kreis Harrien